Aglaia rufinervis is a species of tree in the family Meliaceae. It is native to Thailand, Peninsular Malaysia, Singapore, Sumatra, Borneo and Java.

References

rufinervis
Near threatened plants
Trees of Thailand
Trees of Malaya
Trees of Sumatra
Trees of Borneo
Trees of Java
Taxonomy articles created by Polbot